Elisa Simoni (born 26 July 1973) is an Italian politician.

Born in Figline Valdarno, Simoni graduated in political science, and then earned a master's degree in education and human resource management. She was secretary of the  Democrats of the Left of Valdarno Fiorentino and councilor in the municipality of Incisa in Val d'Arno. From 2006 to 2009 she was provincial commissioner for Education in the council led by Matteo Renzi, and between 2009 and 2013 she was provincial commissioner for Labor in the council led by Andrea Barden.

She was elected at the Italian parliament in February 2013 with the Democratic Party.

References

External links  
 Italian Parliament - Elisa Simoni

1973 births
Living people
People from the Province of Florence
Democrats of the Left politicians
Democratic Party (Italy) politicians
Deputies of Legislature XVII of Italy
Politicians of Tuscany
21st-century Italian women politicians
Women members of the Chamber of Deputies (Italy)
University of Florence alumni